Hørsholm is an urban area on the Øresund coast approximately  north of Copenhagen, Denmark. It covers most of Hørsholm Municipality and straddles the borders neighbouring Fredensborg Municipality and Rudersdal Municipality.

Hørsholm proper is developed around Hirschholm Palace, which was constructed in the 1730s, but the town has later absorbed several of the nearby communities that are of much older origins.

History

Palace and market town

Hørsholm was founded in connection with the construction of Hirschholm Palace. Niels Eigtved created a plan for a residence town in 1737 and to stimulate its growth, it was given status as market town in 1739. However, it never came to serve as a market town and was still only a small settlement when the palace was demolished between 1810 and 1816. Over the following decades it grew as a garrison town and a local centre for trade.

Industrialization

A textile factory, later known as the Royal Military Textile Factory, had already been established in Usserød in the 1790s(closed 1981). It was later joined by other industrial enterprises, such as Hørsholm Textile Factory (1885-1975), Hørsholm Tobakspakkeri og Hørsholm Iron Foundry (1900-1965).

20th-century growth
In the 20th century, Hørsholm gradually grew together with the neighbouring communities Usserød, Rungsted and Smidstrup. Most recently, Hørsholm has grown together with Kokkedal in Fredensborg-Humlebæk Municipality and Trørød, Vedbæk and Gammel Holte in Rudersdal Municipality.

Nature, parks and open spaces
Hørsholm Slotshave, the former gardens of Hirschholm Palace, is the largest public park in Hørsholm. A little to the east of it lies Hørsholm Arboretum, part of the University of Copenhagen Faculty of Science. Hørsholm Cemetery is Hørsholm's largest cemetery. Rungsted Beach is Hørsholm's most popular beach but bathing is also possible at Mikkelborg and from several other localities along the coast.

Hørsholm is surrounded by a number of small woodlands. They include Rungsted Hegn–Folehave Skov. Kokkedal Skov, Elleskoven and Stasevang Skov. The larger Jægersborg Hegn, which separates Hørsholm from Skodsborg to the south, adjoins the extensive UNESCO-LISTED deer park Jægersborg Dyrehave.

Culture and attractions
Trommen  ("The Drum") is Hørsholm's principal cultural centre and also home to its main library. Hørsholm is home to several museums. Rungstedlund is the former home of the author Karen Blixen and is now home to the Karen Blixen Museum. The Danish Museum of Hunting and Forestry was based in the few surviving buildings from Hirschholm Palace, but i now moved to Randers. The adjacent Hørsholm Local History Museum contains a Struense exhibition. Gammel Holtegård plays host to temporary art exhibitions as well as a permanent archeological exhibition. The small Fuglsangshus is also used as a venue for changing art exhibitions.

Economy
Hørsholm is linked to engineering consultancy and information technology. DTU science park, a science park now part of the Technical University of Denmark, is home to many technological start-ups.

Hørsholm Hospital used to be a major employer but has now closed.

The Danish roof window and skylight manufacturer VELUX has its company headquarters in Hørsholm.

Transport
 Rungsted Kyst Station and Kokkedal Station on the coast are located on Kystbanen and served by the Oresundtrains which continue to Copenhagen Airport and across the Øresund bridge to Sweden.

The Hørsholm Highway (now Helsingør Highway) is Denmark's oldest highway and connects Hørsholm to Copenhagen to the south and Helsingør to the north.

Notable people

Nobility 

 Princess Louise Auguste of Denmark (1771 in Hirschholm Palace – 1843) very close to her older brother, Crown Prince Frederick 
 Wilhelmine Schröder (1839-1924) a Swedish telegraphist, writer and journalist and confidant and royal mistress of King Charles XV of Sweden

The Arts 
 Johannes Ewald (1743–1781) a Danish national dramatist  and poet, lived in the municipality
 Harald Conrad Stilling (1815–1891) an architect of the Late Classical period
 Claus Bjørn (1944–2005), author, historian and broadcaster
 Sir Stig Fogh Andersen (born 1950) a Danish operatic tenor, a Wagner-tenor
 Jesper Kyd (born 1972) a Danish composer and sound designer
 Alex Vargas (born 1988) a Danish singer, songwriter and record producer

Science, Business & Public Service 
 Rogert Møller (1844-1918) a Danish architect, credit union manager and local politician 
 Mary Westenholz (1857–1947 in Hørsholm) a Danish Unitarian, women's rights activist, writer and editor; aunt and supporter of Karen Blixen 
 Holger Scheuermann (1877–1960) a surgeon, eponymn for Scheuermann's disease
 Gunnar Dyrberg (1921 – 2012 in Hørsholm) a member of the Danish resistance during WWII
 Henrik Stiesdal (born 1957) an inventor and businessman in the modern wind power industry
 Karen Ellemann (born 1969) politician and former teacher, lives in Hørsholm 
 Jakob Ellemann-Jensen (born 1973) a Danish politician, former Army officer and lawyer
 Sofie Carsten Nielsen (born 1975) politician and former Higher Education Minister 
 Anja Cetti Andersen (born 1965) an astronomer and astrophysicist

Sport 

 Charles Buchwald (1880 – 1951 in Hørsholm) a Danish amateur footballer, played seven games for Denmark and team silver medallist at the 1908 and 1912 Summer Olympics
 Susanne Slotsager (born 1966) a Danish female curler
 Anisette Torp-Lind (born 1971) a former figure skater, competed at the 1992 Winter Olympics 
 Tommy Løvenkrands (born 1974) a former footballer, 157 club caps
 Louise Hansen (born 1975) a retired footballer, Denmark's most successful woman footballer, she played 98 games for Denmark from 1995 to 2007 
 Tine Baun (born 1979) a former badminton player, won the women's All England Open Badminton Championships three times in 2008, 2010 and 2013 
 Peter Løvenkrands (born 1980) a former footballer, 313 club caps and 22 for Denmark
 Per Holten Møller (born 1952) a Danish former ice hockey player
 Christina Nielsen (born 1992) a Danish auto racing driver

See also
Civic Alternative

References

Municipal seats in the Capital Region of Denmark
Municipal seats of Denmark
Cities and towns in the Capital Region of Denmark
Hørsholm Municipality